Verdi Boyer (September 2, 1911 – May 27, 2003) was an American football player. He played professionally as a guard for the Brooklyn Dodgers of the National Football League (NFL) for one season.

References

1911 births
2003 deaths
Brooklyn Dodgers (NFL) players
American football guards